The starry sturgeon (Acipenser stellatus) also known as stellate sturgeon or sevruga (Drakul,  and ), is a species of sturgeon. It is native to the Black, Azov, Caspian and Aegean sea basins, but it has been extirpated from the last and it is predicted that the remaining natural population will follow soon due to overfishing. 

The starry sturgeon is an anadromous species, which migrates up rivers to spawn.

It is considered critically endangered by the IUCN and international trade in this species (including its caviar) is restricted by CITES.

Description
It is a slim-bodied fish easily distinguished from other sturgeons by its long, thin and straight snout. A row of five small barbels lies closer to the mouth than to the tip of the snout. The scales on the lateral line number between thirty and forty and these features distinguish this fish from the Russian sturgeon (Acipenser gueldenstaedtii). Its general colouring is dark greyish-green or brown with a pale underside. The scales on the lateral line are pale. The maximum reported age for this species is 27 years.

Biology
The starry sturgeon is a harmless species that feeds on fish, worms, crustaceans and mollusks. It lies on the bottom during the day and feeds mostly at night. This fish is anadromous and moves upriver into shallow waters to spawn.

Uses

The starry sturgeon is an important commercial species of fish. It is one of the three most important species for caviar, see Sevruga caviar, along with the Beluga sturgeon and the Ossetra sturgeon. Its flesh is considered an expensive delicacy in the Caspian region. It is used to make kabaabs, or is consumed pan fried, broiled, or smoked. There have been several attempts in Russia, Iran, Italy, and the United States to adapt this species for aquaculture, with varying degrees of success.

The resilience of this species is low. The minimum population doubling time is 4.5 – 14 years.

See also

 World Sturgeon Conservation Society

References

External links

Acipenser
Fish of the Caspian Sea
Fish of the Black Sea
Fish of Central Asia
Fish of Europe
Critically endangered fish
Critically endangered fauna of Asia
Critically endangered biota of Europe
Taxa named by Peter Simon Pallas
Fish described in 1771